"I Can See Clearly" is a song by American singer Debbie Harry, released as the first single from her fourth solo album, Debravation.

Song information
After taking a brief hiatus from her solo music career, Harry released the track as the first single from her fourth solo album, Debravation, on June 21, 1993. The single brought her back the attention of US Dance Clubs and peaked at number two on the US Billboard Dance Club Play chart. It was also a moderate success in the United Kingdom, where it reached number 23 in July 1993. The single also peaked at number 96 on the Australian ARIA Singles Chart in September 1993.

Track listings
All tracks were written by Arthur Baker and Tony McIlwaine unless otherwise noted.

US seven-track CD
 "I Can See Clearly" (single version) – 3:58
 "I Can See Clearly" (the club mix) – 7:51
 "I Can See Clearly" (Boriqua Tribal mix) – 4:30
 "I Can See Clearly" (Blonde Rave) – 4:38
 "I Can See Clearly" (Dub-A-Mental) – 4:37
 "I Can See Clearly" (Hot Single mix) – 4:32
 "I Can See Clearly" (N.Y.C. dub) – 4:37

US two-track CD
 "I Can See Clearly" (single version) – 3:58
 "I Can See Clearly" (album version) – 3:52

UK CD1  
 "I Can See Clearly" (album version) – 3:52
 "Atomic" (Harry, Stein) – 4:35
 Blondie: original version from 1979 album Eat to the Beat
 " Heart of Glass" (Harry, Stein) – 3:58
 Blondie: faded The Best of Blondie version, original version appears on Parallel Lines

UK CD2  
 "I Can See Clearly" (Album Version) – 3:52
 "Call Me" (Moroder, Harry) – 3:30
 Blondie: original 1980 7-inch edit from The Best of Blondie
 "In Love with Love" (Phil Harding 7-inch edit) (Harry, Stein) – 3:20
 Original version available on 1986 album Rockbird

UK 12-inch 
 "I Can See Clearly" (D:reamix) – 6:45
 "I Can See Clearly" (D:ream instrumental) – 6:46
 "I Can See Clearly" (Deep South mix) – 5:55
 "I Can See Clearly" (Murk Habana dub) – 5:36

UK cassette  
 "I Can See Clearly" (album version) – 3:52
 "Standing In My Way" (Foxx, Harry) – 4:24
 Non-album version, guest vocals Joey Ramone

Charts

Weekly charts

Year-end charts

References

1993 singles
1993 songs
Chrysalis Records singles
Debbie Harry songs
Reprise Records singles
Sire Records singles
Song recordings produced by Arthur Baker (musician)
Songs written by Arthur Baker (musician)